Cap d'Agde is a seaside resort on France's Mediterranean coast. It is located in the commune of Agde, in the Hérault department within the region of Occitanie. Cap d'Agde was planned by architect Jean Le Couteur as part of one of the largest state-run development schemes in French history. In the 1960s, the only buildings at the Cap were small houses that were typically used by locals over the weekends. It is now one of the largest leisure ports on the French Mediterranean.

Agde can be reached by TGV SNCF train direct from Paris or Lille whilst the closest airport is Béziers-Cap-d'Agde airport, which runs direct budget airline services to the UK and Scandinavia.  Cap d'Agde is also served by Montpellier-Fréjorgues airport. Public transport (taxi or bus) is available between Agde and Cap d'Agde. 
 
The Musée de l'Ephèbe houses the bronze nude statue known as "l'Ephèbe d'Agde" ("the Youth of Agde"). The statue was discovered in the river Hérault and was housed in the Louvre Museum prior to suitable facilities being made available in Cap d'Agde to house it.

Village Naturiste 

Cap d'Agde has a large naturist resort. The Village Naturiste is a large part at the north-eastern edge of Cap d'Agde. It is fenced-off with an entrance gate, but it is also accessible along the public beach from the east. It is a self-contained town (sometimes referred to as the "Naked City"), where nudity is legal and common. In the evening, when it gets colder, more people are dressed, sometimes in revealing clothes. A local tourist tax is charged per person, per day.

The Village Naturiste is also becoming a hotspot for swingers and libertines.

The Naturist Village is a self-sufficient town. It has a  beach, a large marina, places for 2,500 campers, apartment complexes, hotel, shops, restaurants, night clubs, bars, a post office, a bank and ATMs, launderettes, hairdressers and other facilities.

A history of naturism at Cap d'Agde 
The land adjoining the long sandy beach at Cap d'Agde was owned for many years by the Oltra family who farmed the olive groves behind the sand dunes adjoining the beach. After the Second World War the brothers Oltra noticed that people were coming in increasing numbers to camp on their land, and that many of these people liked to bathe and to sunbathe nude.

The Oltra brothers began to formalise arrangements for campers on their land, and this subsequently led to the creation of a caravanning and camping resort, called the 'Oltra Club' . The camp grew increasingly popular, especially with young families and German and Dutch tourists.

In the early 1970s the government of Georges Pompidou drew up plans for the development of the Languedoc-Roussillon coastline. Naturism initially had no part in these proposals, but Paul René Oltra, one of the brothers, persuaded the authorities to include plans for a naturist resort at Cap d'Agde. In 1973 the beach was officially designated as a naturist beach. Regulations for the new resort were also promulgated. The Naturist Village would be a place where voyeurs and exhibitionists would not be welcome.

Early developments 
The first development was the construction of flats, shops and pools at Port Nature and Port Ambonne. Later, Heliopolis and Port Venus were built and Port Nature was considerably extended. The flats were sold and the owners often let them when they did not require them for their own use. The Naturist Village became a controlled zone during the season with regulated access. Everyone entering was informed of the regulations and required to comply with them.

The 1980s 
By the early 1980s, the Naturist Village was reaching the limit of its development. Many shops and commercial premises remained empty, ready for sale or lease. The election of the government of François Mitterrand was to herald a cooling off of the French economy which lasted well into the following decade. During this time the Naturist Village continued to prove a popular resort and it developed a relaxed and pleasant atmosphere. There were so many German visitors that the Post Office even had a designated postbox for letters and postcards being sent to Germany.

The present position 

The naturist village is also becoming a hotspot for swingers and libertines, with sex-shops and swinger clubs. The swingers are also active on the naturist beaches, which has made many naturist tourists change destination to family friendly naturist resorts.

The naturist village has rules which require nudity as the norm, and which ban photography, the wearing of provocative clothing and the display of indecent items. In 2008, signs were put on display on the beach warning against lewd behaviour. The nightlife centres around clubs and venues. Many open only at certain times of the year. On 23 November 2008, the British newspaper The Sunday Times suggested that fires at three swingers clubs were started by hard-line naturists, or 'nudist mullahs', who oppose the echangistes or libertines.

In 2009, René Oltra, the company that bears the name of the resort's original promoter, required that visitors to its campsite, villas and flats belong to a naturist organisation. However, because of abuses, Cap d'Agde is no longer registered with or supported by the Fédération Française de Naturisme.

In December 2009, the local authority proposed renovations that would make the village almost traffic-free. These renovations involved the construction of tree-lined walkways and promenades, a raised promenade by the beach, and a hotel. Work was to start in early 2012. Other plans included the renovation of buildings and the construction of new façades.

The naturist village creates employment and revenue in a region of France less affluent than others. It creates income for the local authority through property taxes and admission prices.

In September 2020, during the COVID-19 pandemic it was reported that a testing station outside the village found 30% of 800 naturists tested positive for COVID-19. Under normal circumstances at the time—much reduced during the pandemic–the village itself held 10,000 campsite pitches and 15,000 beds, a population density seven times greater than nearby Montpellier.

The naturist beach 

Two security posts feature police and medical facilities. Lifeguards are on duty at several stations, during most of the day. Six restaurants border the southern end of the nude beach. Only one restaurant is available towards the northern end. Even though Cap d'Agde is in France, most of the service staff also speak English.

Marina 

See also 

 Euronat (naturist resort)
 Levant Island
 CHM Montalivet
 Naturism in France
 List of French naturist beaches (In French)
 List of social nudity places in France, Europe
 Platais Island
 Agde
 Naturism
 Wreck of Rochelongue

Notes and references

External links 

 
 Naturism in Cap d’Agde (in English and French)
 Official brochure
 Cap d'Agde UK fans page
 Club Helios
 Peng Travel's Cap d'Agde Site
 An excerpt from The Naked Truth About Cap d'Agde
 Naturism in the Cap d’Agde 

Landforms of Hérault
Naturist resorts
Beaches of Metropolitan France
Tourist attractions in Occitania (administrative region)
Naturism in France